Cedovim is a civil parish in the municipality of Vila Nova de Foz Côa, Portugal. The population in 2011 was 338, in an area of 32.10 km2.

References

Freguesias of Vila Nova de Foz Côa